is a Japanese given name for females.

Possible writings
 徳子, "benevolence child"
 法子, "method, law child"
 則子, "rule child"
 紀子, "chronicle child"
 教子, "teach child"
 範子, "pattern child"
 典子, "rule, precedent, ceremony child"
 規子, "standard, measure child"
 憲子, "constitution child"
 稔子, "child who harvests wisdom and knowledge"

People with the name
 Noriko Arai, Japanese female wheelchair racer
 Noriko H. Arai (born 1962), Japanese mathematical logician and artificial intelligence researcher
, Japanese swimmer
 Noriko Awaya (淡谷 のり子, 1907–1999), Japanese singer
 Noriko Hidaka (日高 のり子), Japanese voice actress
 Noriko Higashide (東出典子), Japanese actress
, Japanese Paralympic swimmer
, Japanese singer and actress
 Noriko Kijima (木嶋のりこ), Japanese actress and gravure model
, Japanese sport shooter
, Japanese fencer
 Noriko Matsueda (松枝 賀子), Japanese video game composer
 Noriko Mitose (みとせのりこ), Japanese singer
 Noriko Mizoguchi (溝口 紀子), Japanese voice actress
, Japanese gymnast
, Japanese judoka
 Noriko Nakagoshi (中越典子), Japanese actress
 Noriko Namiki (並木のり子), Japanese voice actress; see Idaten Jump
 Noriko Ohara (小原 乃梨子 born 1935), Japanese voice actress
 Noriko Ogawa (singer) (小川範子), Japanese actress and singer
 Noriko Ogawa (pianist) (小川典子), Japanese classical pianist
 Noriko Sakai (酒井 法子), Japanese singer and actress
, Japanese manga artist
 Noriko Shitaya (下屋 則子), Japanese voice actress
 Noriko Suzuki (すずき 紀子), Japanese voice actress; see Doctor Neo Cortex
 Tujiko Noriko (born Noriko Tsujiko (辻子紀子), Japanese experimental musician
 Noriko Tatsumi (辰巳典子), Japanese pink film actress
 Noriko Watanabe (渡辺 典子), Japanese actress
, Japanese swimmer
, Japanese female table tennis player
 Noriko Senge (千家典子, born 1988), former princess of the Japanese Imperial Family

Fictional characters
 Noriko Ashida who also goes by the codename Surge from New X-Men
 Noriko Hirayama, a character of the Yasujirō Ozu film, Tokyo Story (the daughter-in-law)
 Noriko Kawada, a character of Digimon
 Noriko Kinoshita, a character of Juvenile
 Noriko Nakagawa, a main character of the book and film Battle Royale
 Noriko Nijo, a character of Maria-sama ga Miteru
 Noriko from Usagi Yojimbo, the villain of the "Treasure of the Mother of Mountains" arc
 Noriko Shimabara, titular character of the film Noriko's Dinner Table
 Noriko Takaya, a character of Gunbuster
 Noriko Ukai, a character of the manga Gravitation
 Noriko Ono, one of the main character's daughters in An Artist of the Floating World
 Noriko Noshimuri, a character of the television series Hawaii Five-0
 Noriko Momoi, a friend character of Mami Sakura from Esper Mami

See also
 Houko Kuwashima (桑島 法子), Japanese voice actress and singer

Japanese feminine given names